Live From Gdańsk (Koncert w Stoczni) (pol. "Shipyard Concert", referring to Gdańsk Shipyard) is a live album by Jean-Michel Jarre, released in 2005, exclusively in Poland. It contains selected songs performed during Jarre's Space of Freedom concert in Gdańsk, Poland, on 26 August 2005, commemorating twenty-five years of the Solidarity movement.

Jean-Michel Jarre performed together with Polish Baltic Philharmonic and Gdańsk University Choir.

Apart from his own works, the album also features Jarre's electronic-style interpretation of Polish protest song "Mury", written by Jacek Kaczmarski in 1978, to the melody of "L'estaca" by Lluís Llach.

Cover art
Cover art features shipyard cranes in the foreground, then a photograph of Gdańsk Shipyard workers, and wooden tablets of 21 demands of MKS in the background.

Critical reception
Fans complained about the length of the album, which contains only nine out of twenty-four songs performed during the event. In their review, Polish magazine Teraz Rock described this release as "undoubtedly too short".

Track listing (DVD)
Note: Jean-Michel Jarre has a long practice of changing the names of his songs when performing them live (see the list of Jean-Michel Jarre compositions with multiple titles for details). In such case, original name is indicated below the new one.

Solidarność Live
 "Shipyard Overture"
 original title: "Industrial Revolution Overture"
 "Suite for Flute"
 "Oxygene 2"
 "Tribute To Chopin"
 "Aero"
 "Oxygene 4"
 "Souvenir"
 original title: "Souvenir of China"
 "Space of Freedom"
 original title: "March 23"
 "Theremin Memories"
 "Chronologie 2"
 "Mury"
 "Chronologie 6"
 "Oxygene 8"
 "Light My Sky"
 original title: "Tout Est Bleu"
 "Tribute to Jean Paul II"
 original title: "Acropolis"
 "Rendez-Vous 2"
 "Vivaldi: Summer – Presto"
 "Oxygene 12"
 "Rendez-Vous 4"
 "Solidarnosc Tonight"
 original title: "Oxygene 13"
 "Aerology (Remix)"

Track listing (CD)
 "Shipyard Overture" – 4:59
 original title: "Industrial Revolution: Overture"
 "Oxygene 4" – 4:21
 "Mury" – 5:49
 "Space of Freedom" – 5:01
 original title:  "March 23"
 "Oxygene 8" – 4:45
 "Light My Sky" – 4:51
 original title: "Tout Est Bleu"
 "Tribute to John Paul II" – 6:24
 original title: "Akropolis"
 "Rendez-vous 4" – 6:20
 "Aerology Remix" – 5:15

Personnel
 Jean-Michel Jarre – keyboards, mixing desk, laser harp, theremin, vocals
 Francis Rimbert – keyboards, electronic percussions
 Claude Samard – keyboards, guitars, musical coordinator
 Polish Baltic Philharmonic
 Gdańsk University Choir
 Michal Nesterowicz – conductor

Certification and sales

References

Jean-Michel Jarre live albums
2005 live albums